, better known as , was a Japanese actor and voice actor from Ōhito, Shizuoka (now Izunokuni, Shizuoka) attached to Mausu Promotion.

He died of gallbladder cancer at the age of 87.

Filmography

Live-action

Film
 Baka ga Tank Deyattekuru (xxxx) (Officer Momota)
 Mr. Baseball (xxxx) (Hiroshi Nakamura)
 Otokoniha Tsuraiyo: Kuchibuewofuku Torajirō (xxxx) (Osamu)
 Tora-san's Love Call (1971) (Osamu Suwa)
 Sayonara Morocco (xxxx) (Mura-san)
 Shigen (xxxx) (Tabuchi)
 Uchū Daikaijū Guilala (xxxx) (FAFC technical officer)
 Kichiku (1978) (Mizuguchi)
 Chōchin (1987)

Voice acting

Television animation
 Cybersix (xxxx) (Doctor Von Reichter)
 L/R: Licensed by Royalty (xxxx) (Taylor)
 Tenshi no Takutikusu ~Yume no Kakera wa Koroshi no Kaori~ (xxxx) (Chingensai)

OVA
 Ginga Eiyū Densetsu (xxxx) (Neguroponty)

Theatrical animation
Boku no Son Gokū (xxxx) (Tentei)
Detective Conan: Jolly Roger in the Deep Azure (xxxx) (Kazuo Mima)
Doraemon: Nobita to Fushigi Kazetsukai (xxxx) (Elder)
Doraemon: Nobita to Robot Kingdom (xxxx) (Doctor Chapekku)
Esper Mami: Hoshizora's Dancing Doll (xxxx) (Megumi's Papa)
Genma Taisen (xxxx) (Kafū)
Hoshi no Orpheus (1978) 
WXIII Kidō Keisatsu Patlabor (2002) (Toshirō Kurisu)

Video games
 GeGeGe no Kitarō: Ibun Yōkai Kitan (xxxx) (Konaki Jijii)
 GeGeGe no Kitarō: Kikiippotsu! Yōkai Rettō (xxxx) (Konaki Jijii)
 Onimusha 2: Samurai's Destiny (xxxx) (Ginghamphatts)
 Spyro 2: Ripto's Rage! (xxxx) (The Professor)
 Yoshitsuneki (xxxx) (Taira no Kiyomori)

Dubbing roles
Christopher Lloyd
Back to the Future (TV Asahi edition) (Dr. Emmett "Doc" Brown)
Back to the Future Part II (TV Asahi edition) (Dr. Emmett "Doc" Brown)
Back to the Future Part III (TV Asahi edition) (Dr. Emmett "Doc" Brown)
The Pagemaster (Mr. Dewey / The Pagemaster)
Alice in Wonderland (The White Knight)
Chuck (Dr. Leo Dreyfus)
Piranha 3D (Mr. Goodman)
Piranha 3DD (Mr. Goodman)
The Michael J. Fox Show (Principal McTavish)
I Am Not a Serial Killer (Crowley)
Going in Style (Milton Kupchak)
Eli Wallach
The Magnificent Seven (1974 TV Asahi edition) (Calvera)
Lord Jim (The General)
How to Steal a Million (Davis Leland)
A Lovely Way to Die (Tennessee Fredericks)
Mackenna's Gold (TV Asahi edition) (Ben Baker)
Cinderella Liberty (Forshay)
12 Angry Men (Juror #4 (E. G. Marshall))
12 Angry Men (Juror #8 (Jack Lemmon))
 Airport 1975 (Scott Freeman)
 Alien (1992 VHS/DVD edition) (Brett (Harry Dean Stanton))
 Coming to America (1991 Fuji TV edition) (Cleo McDowell (John Amos))
 Crimson Tide (Nippon TV edition) (Captain Frank Ramsey)
 Day of the Animals (Paul Jenson)
 The Deep (Romer Treece)
 Dinosaurs (B.P. Richfield)
 Django (1980 TV Tokyo edition) (General Hugo Rodríguez)
 Duel (TV edition) (David Mann (Dennis Weaver))
 The Fly II (Anton Bartok)
 For Your Eyes Only (TBS edition) (Aristotle Kristatos)
 The Godfather (1976 NTV edition) (Santino "Sonny" Corleone (James Caan))
 The Godfather Part II (1980 NTV edition) (Santino "Sonny" Corleone (James Caan))
 The Hot Rock (Andy Kelp)
 Lawrence of Arabia (TV Asahi edition) (Jackson Bentley)
 Little House on the Prairie (Doctor Hiram Baker)
 Midnight Cowboy (TV Asahi edition) (Enrico "Ratso" Rizzo)
 Mighty Morphin Power Rangers: The Movie (Ivan Ooze)
 Never Talk to Strangers (Max Cheski (Harry Dean Stanton))
 Perry Mason (Perry Mason)
 Speed (Howard Payne (Dennis Hopper))
 Super Mario Bros. (King Koopa (Dennis Hopper))
 Trading Places (1992 Fuji TV edition) (Coleman (Denholm Elliott))
 UFO (Doctor Doug Jackson)

References

External links
 Mausu Promotion

1931 births
2018 deaths
Japanese male film actors
Japanese male voice actors
Actors from Shizuoka Prefecture
Male voice actors from Shizuoka Prefecture
20th-century Japanese male actors
Deaths from cancer in Japan
Deaths from gallbladder cancer
21st-century Japanese male actors
Mausu Promotion voice actors